Winifred May de Kok, M.D. (17 May 1893 – 1969) was a South Africa born writer.

Biography
She was born in South Africa on 17 May 1893 and attended medical school in England during the 1920s. She married Alfred Edgar Coppard, the British short story writer at Oxford and a leading light of a literary group, the New Elizabethans. She practiced medicine until 1953. In that year she became a television broadcaster, for a show that discussed family life and family health. The show was broadcast by the BBC as Tell Me, Doctor.  A forthright spokeswoman for women's and neonates' health before the era of family planning, she published several books and articles on parenting and family health. She died in 1969.

Selected works
New Babes for Old (1932)
First Baby (1947)
You and Your Child (1955)
Your Baby and You (1957)

References

1893 births
1969 deaths
South African television personalities
South African women physicians
South African physicians
20th-century South African women writers
20th-century South African physicians
20th-century South African writers
20th-century women physicians